Rusty Medals and Broken Badges is the debut full-length studio album from Californian hardcore punk band, Over My Dead Body. It was released in November, 2001 on Indecision Records. In addition to the CD format, it was also released on limited edition vinyl pressings of 103 red, 286 purple, and 603 black.

Track listing
"Maggie and Ronnie"  	– 2:13  	   
"Rusty Medals and Broken Badges" 	– 2:56 	
"True Till Tomorrow" 	– 2:38 	
"Let It All Burn" 	– 2:50 	
"Real Cancer" 	– 1:48 	
"To the Core" 	– 2:39 	
"Cloak and Dagger" 	– 2:22 	
"Breakaway" 	– 2:05 	
"Silver Platter Hardcore" 	– 2:07 	
"C.A.N.E.S." 	– 0:30 	
"Cut Out Your Eyes to Spite Millions" 	– 3:15 	
"96 and Counting" 	– 1:37 	
"When Saturday Comes" 	– 17:11

Credits
 Daniel Sant – vocals
 Scott Lopian – guitar
 Aaron Cooley – guitar
 Rob Moran – bass
 Tommy Anthony – drums
 Engineered by Jeff Forrest
 Mastered by Paul Miner

External links
 Indecision Records album page

2001 debut albums
Over My Dead Body (band) albums
Indecision Records albums